Brighton Park may refer to:
 Brighton Park, Chicago, USA
 Brighton Park crossing in Chicago
 New Brighton Park in Vancouver, Canada
 Queen's Park, Brighton, England
 Brighton Parks Police in England
 East Brighton Park in England